Tammiku is a village in Kose Parish, Harju County in northern Estonia. Tammiku was the site of a 1994 unintentional disturbance of radiocaesium which resulted in one human fatality.

References

 

Villages in Harju County